The list below consists of the reasons delivered from the bench by the Supreme Court of Canada during 1996. This list, however, does not include decisions on motions.

Reasons

References 
 1996 decisions: CanLII

Reasons Of The Supreme Court Of Canada, 1996
Supreme Court of Canada reasons by year